Edward Mboya (born 5 June 1982) is a Kenyan former cricketer.

Mboya was part of the Kenya under-19 squad for the 1998 Under-19 Cricket World Cup in South Africa, making six Youth One Day International appearances during the tournament. Later that same year he was part of the Kenya squad for the Commonwealth Games in Malaysia, making two List A appearances against Pakistan and Scotland. He scored 5 runs against Pakistan and was dismissed without scoring against Scotland. Mboya did not feature again for Kenya following the Commonwealth Games.

References

External links

1982 births
Living people
People from Nairobi
Kenyan cricketers
Cricketers at the 1998 Commonwealth Games